The 1982 Gloweave Indoor Championships, also known as the Melbourne Indoor Championships,  was an Association of Tennis Professionals men's tournament played on indoor carpet courts at the Festival Hall in Melbourne, Victoria, Australia. It was the third edition of the tournament, which was part of the  1982 Grand Prix tennis circuit, and was held from 4 October until 10 October 1982. First-seeded Vitas Gerulaitis won the singles title, his second at the event after 1982, and earned $20,000 first-prize money.

Finals

Singles
 Vitas Gerulaitis defeated  Eliot Teltscher 2–6, 6–2, 6–2
 It was Gerulaitis's 4th singles title of the year and the 23rd of his career.

Doubles
 Francisco González /  Matt Mitchell defeated  Syd Ball /  Rod Frawley 7–6, 7–6

References

External links
 ITF tournament edition details

Gloweave Indoor Championships
Gloweave Indoor Championships, 1982
Gloweave Indoor Championships
Gloweave Indoor Championships